Seemless was an American rock/metal group formed by ex-Shadows Fall/Unearth drummer Derek Kerswill, Killswitch Engage vocalist Jesse Leach, and ex-Overcast/Killswitch Engage guitarist Pete Cortese.

Formed in 2002 following Leach's departure from Killswitch Engage, Seemless was signed to Equal Vision Records, and released their first LP, Seemless. They toured with Nonpoint, Trivium, In Flames, SOiL, Fu Manchu, Lacuna Coil, and several others.

In late 2012/early 2013 it was announced that Threshold of Pain Records, an imprint label of media company Nefarious Realm would be re-issuing their debut album Seemless on limited edition vinyl.

Breakup 
In 2009, Seemless announced that the band would play its final show on September 12, 2009 at The Lucky Dog in Worcester, Massachusetts. Derek Kerswill joined Unearth, while Jeff Fultz and Pete Cortese concentrated on their new band, Bloodwitch. Jesse Leach started several projects and then rejoined Killswitch Engage in February 2012.

Albums
Seemless (2005)
What Have We Become (2006)

References

American alternative metal musical groups
American hard rock musical groups
Heavy metal musical groups from Massachusetts
Rock music groups from Massachusetts
American southern rock musical groups
American stoner rock musical groups
2002 establishments in Massachusetts
Musical groups established in 2002
Musical groups disestablished in 2009
Equal Vision Records artists